Pirie is a Scottish surname of French origin, meaning "pear tree".

People with the name 
 Alexander Fraser Pirie (1849-1903), Canadian journalist and newspaper editor
 Antoinette Pirie (1905–1991), British biochemist
 Billy Pirie (born 1949), Scottish footballer
 Bob Pirie (1916-1984), Canadian swimmer and three time Olympic gold medalist
 Brad Pirie (born 1955), Canadian former ice hockey player
 Charles Pirie (1897-1960), Scottish chess player
 David Pirie, English screenwriter, film producer, critic and novelist
 Daphne Pirie (born 1931), Australian athlete and sports administrator
 Denis Pirie (fl. 1960s-1980s), British far right politician
 Douglas J. Pirie (c. 1907-1935) English motorcycle racer 
 Duncan Pirie (1858-1931), Scottish Liberal politician
 Elizabeth Pirie (1932-2005), British numismatist and museum curator
 George Pirie (disambiguation)
 Gordon Pirie (1931-1991), English long-distance runner and orienteerer
 Harvey Pirie (1878-1965), Scottish bacteriologist
 Irene Pirie (1914–1998), Canadian freestyle swimmer
 Jacqueline Pirie (born 1975), Scottish actress
 James Pirie (1853–1934), Major League Baseball shortstop
 Jane Pirie (1779–1833), Scottish educator
 Sir John Pirie, 1st Baronet (died 1851), alderman and Lord Mayor of the city of London
 John Pirie (MP) (died 1402 or later), Member of Parliament for Canterbury, Kent in 1401
 Julia Pirie (1918-2008), British MI5 spy
 Lockwood Pirie (1904-1965), American competitive sailor
 Madsen Pirie (born 1940), British researcher, author and educator
 Mark Pirie (born 1974), New Zealand poet, writer, literary critic, publisher and editor
 Morag Pirie (born 1975), Scottish football referee
 Norman Pirie (1907-1997), British biochemist
 Peter J. Pirie (1916–1997), English musicologist and critic
 Robert Pirie (disambiguation)
 Tom Pirie (1896–1966), Scottish footballer
 William Robinson Pirie (1804–1885), Scottish minister and educator
 Pirie MacDonald (1867-1942), American portrait photographer, civic leader and peace activist

See also 
 Port Pirie (disambiguation), articles associated with the city in South Australia
 Piri (disambiguation)
 Pirrie, a surname (with a list of people surnamed Pirrie)
 John Pirie (ship), built 1827, sailed to South Australia 1836

References 

Hebrew-language surnames
Scottish surnames